Thomas Leslie Weatherhead (1914–2011) is an English Anglican priest. He was Dean of Nassau, Bahamas, from 1965 to 1972.

Weatherhead was educated at Hatfield College, Durham, and ordained in 1938. After  curacies in Beeston Hill and Leyburn he was a chaplain in the RAFVR from 1942 to 1947. When peace returned he served incumbencies at Halton, New Mills and Staveley, Derbyshire before his time as dean and Felmingham and  Banningham afterwards.

References

Alumni of Hatfield College, Durham
Deans of Nassau
1914 births
2011 deaths
Royal Air Force Volunteer Reserve personnel of World War II
Royal Air Force chaplains
World War II chaplains